The La Boca Formation is a geological formation in Tamaulipas state, northeast Mexico. It was thought to date back to the Early Jurassic, concretely the Pliensbachian stage epoch. Although, the latest studies had proven that the local Vulcanism, related to the aperture of the Atlantic Ocean and the several Rift Events, that continue until the Bajocian, while the unit itself was likely deposited between the earliest Pliensbachian, as proven by zircon (189.0 ± 0.2 Ma) with the fossil taxa deposited on the rocks above, likely of Late Pliensbachian-Lower Toarcian age, and the upper section of Late Toarcian-Late Aalenian age. Due to successions of Aalenian depositional sistems on the upper layers of the Huizachal Canyon, has been delimited the formation to the Toarcian stage, being the regional equivalent of the Moroccan Azilal Formation. In North America, La Boca Formation was found to be a regional equivalent of the Eagle Mills redbeds of southern United States, the Todos Santos Formation of southern Mexico and the Barracas Group of the Sonora desert region.



Paleoenvironment
La Boca Formation is genetically related to the Nazas volcanic Arc of the same age (Pliensbachian-Aalenian, ~189.5–171.6 Ma) when Mexico evolved in a convergent plate margin, with the Gulf of Mexico remaining as a restricted basin and a passive margin. The influence of this arcs is seen on the fact continental units such as Todos Santos Formation deposited back then volcanic materials in both nonmarine strata and marginal marine red beds of eastern Mexico. La Boca Formation left its sediments on a basin formed between the Nazas Volcanic Arc center and the so-called Huizachal-Peregrina Anticlinorium, with layers whose origin is linked with channels fills and channel belts filling valleys, as well braided river deposits with different flooding levels. In locations such as Aramberri the development of fluvial channels and the flooding of surfaces was restricted, mostly due to the presence of flanking volcanic activity, as well the local Paleozoic basement highs. In this outcrop the fluvial system evolved on several ways: from braided to ephemeral sandy meandering towards the north, with the presence of common laminated sands sheets, likely a local indicator of unconfined flash floods across floodplains, with some sections recovering periods of desiccation thanks to the presence of Mudcracks. Towards the south, in localities such as El Olmo Canyon the layers show east–west oriented gravelly braided rivers that evolved towards the south of the location into high-sinuosity single-thread meandering rivers. Other southern localities such as the Caballeros Canyon and Huizachal Canyon have layers that record gravel-bed braided rivers over a floodplain with high-energy flows, element recorded on the local stratigraphy as older layers where highly degraded by the increased force of the younger flows and the rock fragments moved by the currents are bigger in upper layers. In the southernmost outcrop, in Miquihuana the sheet sands show greater flooding events than on any other location.

The main fossiliferous level of the Huizachal Canyon with more than 8000 specimens found, where the preservation of delicate specimens such as Pterosaurs suggest an environment with little transportation and reworking, yet the fossils were not buried in situ, as most of the smaller specimens show desarticulation. All data trends suggest a highly unusual debris-flow environment, where local fluvial alluvial bodies were not big enough to sustain large freshwater biota such as fishes and most of the preserved specimens were fast buried near the place of death.

Fossil record

Ichnofossils

Synapsida

Lepidosauromorpha

Sphenodontia

Pterosauria

Crocodylomorpha

Dinosauria

Macroflora

See also 
 
 List of dinosaur-bearing rock formations
 List of pterosaur-bearing stratigraphic units

References 

Jurassic Mexico
Geography of Tamaulipas
Early Jurassic North America
Middle Jurassic North America
Geologic formations of Mexico
Natural history of Tamaulipas
Paleontology in Mexico
Jurassic System of North America